Anthony Kimbrough (born January 20, 1964) is a former American college and professional football player who was a quarterback in the Canadian Football League (CFL) and the Arena Football League (CFL). He played college football at Grand Rapids Community College before transferring Western Michigan University, earning Mid-American Conference (MAC) player of the year honors in 1988.

In May 2014, Kimbrough was named the head football coach at East Kentwood (Mich.) HS, where he had been an assistant coach for two years.

References

1964 births
Living people
American football quarterbacks
American players of Canadian football
Utah Blaze coaches
BC Lions players
Buffalo Destroyers players
Canadian football quarterbacks
Charlotte Rage players
Junior college football coaches in the United States
Players of American football from Detroit
Grand Rapids Raiders football players
San Jose SaberCats players
Coaches of American football from Michigan
Western Michigan Broncos football coaches
Western Michigan Broncos football players
Grand Rapids Community College alumni